A sightholder is a company on the De Beers Global Sightholder Sales's (DBGSS) list of authorized bulk purchasers of rough diamonds. De Beers Group made this list, the second largest miner of diamonds. DBGSS was previously known as DTC (Diamond Trading Company). In May 2006, DTC released a list of the 93 sightholders on its website.

The DTC Sightholder list was further reduced to 79 companies worldwide in December 2007.  The list of selected companies for the 2008-2011 contract period was published in April 2008.

The DTC list of sightholders for 2021 is as follows;

A. Dalumi Diamonds
Almod Diamonds Ltd.
AMC NV
Ankit Gems Private Limited
Arjav Diamonds NV
Asian Star Company Limited
Chow Sang Sang Jewellery Company Limited
Chow Tai Fook Jewellery Co.Ltd.
Dali Diamond Co.
Dharmanandan Diamonds Pvt Ltd
Diacor International Ltd.
Dianco
Diarough NV
Dimexon International Holding BV
Finestar Jewellery & Diamonds Pvt. Ltd.
Hari Krishna Exports Pvt. Ltd.
Hasenfeld-Stein Inc.
H Dipak
Hvk International Private Limited
IGC Group LTD
Jasani
Jewelex India Private Limited
Julius Klein Diamonds LLC
K Girdharlal International Limited
KARP Impex Ltd.
KGK Diamonds (I) Private Limited
Kiran Gems Private Limited
KP Sanghvi & Sons
Laurelton Diamonds
Laxmi Diamond Pvt Ltd.
M Suresh Company Private Limited
Mahendra Brothers Exports Private Limited
Mohit Diamonds Private Limited
Niru Diamonds Israel (1987) Ltd.
Pluczenik Diamond Company NV
Premier Gem (Group)
Rosy Blue (India) Pvt. Ltd.
Rosy Blue (NV) Business Alliance
S. Vinodkumar Diamonds Pvt. Ltd
Safdico
Sahar Atid Diamonds Ltd.
Schachter and Namdar (Pty) Ltd
Shairu Gems
Sheetal Manufacturing Company PVT LTD
Shree Ramkrishna Exports Private Limited
Taché Company NV
Tasaki & Co Ltd.
Trau Bros NV
Venus Jewel
Yerushalmi Bros. Diamonds Ltd
Yoshfe Diamonds International Ltd.

References

De Beers
Diamond dealers